Herbert Otto Emanuel Schade (26 May 1922 – 1 March 1994) was a West German long-distance runner who competed for Germany at the 1952 Summer Olympics and for the United Team of Germany at the 1956 Summer Olympics. In 1952 he won a bronze medal in the 5000 m event, behind Alain Mimoun and Emil Zátopek. Four years later he placed 12th over 5000 m and 9th over 10,000 m. Schade won eight West German titles in these two events and finished fourth in the 10,000 m at the 1954 European Championships.

Schade was a baker by profession. In 1958 he retired from competitions and published an autobiography Als Leichtathlet in 5 Erdteilen (As a Track and Field Athlete in Five Continents). He then coached long-distance runners at the national level and took various administrative position in German regional athletics associations. He was a member of the jury for athletics events at the 1972 Munich Olympics. In 1978–90 together with his wife he headed the Association of Former Athletes.

References

1922 births
1994 deaths
People from Solingen
Sportspeople from Düsseldorf (region)
People from the Rhine Province
German male long-distance runners
West German male long-distance runners
Olympic male long-distance runners
Olympic athletes of Germany
Olympic athletes of the United Team of Germany
Olympic bronze medalists for Germany
Olympic bronze medalists in athletics (track and field)
Athletes (track and field) at the 1952 Summer Olympics
Athletes (track and field) at the 1956 Summer Olympics
Medalists at the 1952 Summer Olympics
Japan Championships in Athletics winners